Torrassa or La Torrassa may refer to:

 La Torrassa (L'Hospitalet de Llobregat), a neighbourhood in the municipality of L'Hospitalet de Llobregat, Catalonia, Spain
 Torrassa metro station, on the Barcelona Metro system in the Barcelona metropolitan area, Catalonia, Spain